George Edward Jenkins (September 1904 – January 1985) was a Canadian soccer player who began his career in Canada, spent a single season in the American Soccer League and ended it in Scotland.

Jenkins was born in Stockton-on-Tees, England, but his family moved to Canada when he was two. They settled in Montreal and he began his senior career with Montreal CPR of the Canadian National Soccer League. At some point he also played for the Montreal Maroons. In 1926, he moved south and signed with Indiana Flooring in the American Soccer League. He played only nine league games, but scored five goals, adding another goal in two National Challenge Cup games. He then returned to Montreal, rejoining the Maroons. Although he had played as a center forward up to this time, he now moved into the nets as a result of a serious knee injury and where he remained for the rest of his career.  After recovery from injury he first played for Rosemount Rangers in Montreal in 1929, then Iberville in the Montreal and District League in 1931, and then on to Montreal CPR in 1932 and Montreal Carsteel in 1933. In 1933, Jenkins moved to Scotland and signed with Rangers. He then moved to Kilmarnock for a season, but did not feature in the league. He ended his career with Hamilton Academical during the 1946–47 season.

References

1904 births
1985 deaths
Footballers from Stockton-on-Tees
Footballers from County Durham
Soccer players from Montreal
Anglophone Quebec people
British emigrants to Canada
Canadian soccer players
Association football forwards
Association football goalkeepers
Association football utility players
Kilmarnock F.C. players
Montreal Carsteel players
Montreal CPR players
Montreal Maroons (soccer) players
Indiana Flooring players
Rangers F.C. players
Hamilton Academical F.C. players
American Soccer League (1921–1933) players
Scottish Football League players
Canadian expatriate soccer players
Canadian expatriate sportspeople in the United States
Expatriate soccer players in the United States
Canadian expatriate sportspeople in Scotland
Expatriate footballers in Scotland
Canadian National Soccer League players